Caucasia Airport or Juan H. White Airport  is an airport serving Caucasia, a city and municipality of the Antioquia Department in Colombia.

The runway is on the south edge of the town. Both are on the west bank of the Cauca River.

Airlines and destinations

See also
Transport in Colombia
List of airports in Colombia

References

External links 
OurAirports - Caucasia
SkyVector - Caucasia
OpenStreetMap - Caucasia

Airports in Colombia
Buildings and structures in Antioquia Department